Conway Recording Studios is a recording studio in Hollywood, California.

People and awards 
Conway started in the early 1970s as a mastering studio. In 1976, the studio began recording albums, including projects by Elton John and Stevie Wonder. The complex has been rebuilt from the ground up by studio designer and architect Vincent Van Haaff.

Grammy Award-winning producer and engineer Peter Mokran often uses Studio B.

Facilities 
Conway's studio perimeter includes a tropical garden area, and is located in a  gated complex. This feature makes it harder for paparazzi to photograph and enter the studio and parking area, improving the privacy of higher-end artists and music professionals.

References

External links 
 Conway Recording Studios
 Conway Recording Studios on Facebook
 Conway Recording Studios on IMDB

Recording studios in California
1972 establishments in California